Natterer's gecko (Tropiocolotes nattereri) is a species of lizard in the family Gekkonidae. The species is endemic to northeastern Africa and Western Asia.

Geographic range
T. nattereri is found in Egypt, Israel, Jordan, and Saudi Arabia.

Etymology
The specific epithet, nattereri, is in honor of Austrian ornithologist Johann Natterer.

Reproduction
T. nattereri is oviparous.

References

Further reading
Pasteur G (1960). "Redécouverte et validité probable du Gekkonidé Tropiocolotes nattereri Steindachner ". Comptes Rendus des Séances Mensuelles, Société des Sciences Naturelles et Physique du Maroc 26 (8): 143–145. (in French).
Steindachner F (1901). "Expedition S. M. Schiff “Pola” in das Rothe Meer, Nordliche und Südliche Hälfte. 1895/96 und 1897/98. Zoologische Ergebnisse. XVII. Berichte über die herpetologischen Aufsammlung ". Denkschriften der Kaiserlichen Akademie der Wissenschaften, Mathematisch-Naturwissenschaftliche Classe, Wien 69: 325-339 + Plates I-II. (Tropiocolotes nattereri, new species, pp. 326-327 + Plate I, figures 2, 2a). (in German).
Werner YL (2016). Reptile Life in the Land of Israel. Frankfurt am Main: Edition Chimaira. 494 pp. .

nattereri
Reptiles described in 1901
Reptiles of North Africa
Reptiles of the Arabian Peninsula